Jeanius is the third studio album by American rapper Jean Grae. She worked on it with hip hop producer 9th Wonder and intended to release it in 2004, but the album leaked prematurely and spawned various pirated versions of the unfinished project. After Grae's record deal with the label, Jeanius was released on July 8, 2008, by Talib Kweli's Blacksmith Records.

Background 
Scheduled for release as early as 2004, the album was delayed for unknown reasons and has since been heavily bootlegged on the internet.  The album was released on July 8, 2008, on Talib Kweli's Blacksmith music label. The booklet for the album contains faithful recreations of classic Hip Hop album covers, featuring images of Grae and 9th Wonder superimposed onto covers of Public Enemy's It Takes a Nation of Millions to Hold Us Back, Das EFX's Dead Serious, Raekwon's Only Built 4 Cuban Linx..., and Black Sheep's A Wolf in Sheep's Clothing.

Critical reception 

Andre Barnes of Allmusic called the album "a definitive body of work for both 9th Wonder and Jean Grae — Grae's wit and peculiar charisma are paired with 9th's soulful, sample-heavy production." Alexander F. Remington of The Washington Post felt that 9th Wonder is "not at his best, and as a result the album is merely great rather than classic", but concluded that Grae "proves that she's one of the best MCs alive" with Jeanius. XXL said that she connects with listeners on "an intimate level" with her honesty and "willingness to recount vivid details of painful, haunting past experiences". Pitchfork Media's Nate Patrin wrote that Grae's flow "sounds like a laser-focused, clear-spoken declaration of strength and perseverance", and praised 9th Wonder for tying together all of her "emotional facets" with a "solid, consistent sound".

Although he found its official release "a bit anticlimactic", Mosi Reeves of Spin felt that Grae's "sweet-and-sour lyricism ... still sounds remarkably vibrant", and found 9th Wonder to be "in top form, flipping Phoebe Snow and other soulful '70s samples with emotional fervor." Robert Christgau of MSN Music found her rhymes "jam-packed" and "infinitely smarter about her 'insecurities' and 'moodiness' than her shoegazer counterparts", and gave Jeanius an "A−". Christgau's colleague, Tom Hull, was somewhat less receptive. "Reacting more to the overall vibe", he said Grade is "smart and tight, although this [album] is a bit overwound [and] plagued with guests, who start to get on my nerves."

Track listing

Personnel 
Credits adapted from Allmusic.

 Jean Grae – primary artist
 Edgar Allen Floe – featured artist
 Median – featured artist
 Joe Scudda – featured artist 
 9th Wonder – featured artist, producer
 Phonte – featured artist
 Daily Planet – featured artist
 Berman Fenelus – photography

Charts

See also 
 Love for Sale (Bilal album)

References

Further reading

External links 
 

2008 albums
Jean Grae albums
Albums produced by 9th Wonder
Albums produced by Khrysis